Aurboða (also Aurboda; Old Norse:  "gravel-bidder" or "gravel-offerer") is a jötunn in Norse mythology. She is married to the jötunn Gymir and is the mother of Gerðr.

Name 
The origin of the name  is unclear. The second part is certainly related to the Old Norse verb  ('to offer'), but the meaning of the first element has been debated.

Most scholars connect it to the Old Norse  ('gravel, wet sand or earth, mud'), and translate  as 'gravel-bidder' or 'gravel-offerer'. This interpretation is encouraged by Aurboða's relationship with Gymir and Gerðr, who have also been regarded as chthonic beings in scholarship. An alternative theory is to translate  as 'gold-bidder' by comparing the first element to a word  (from Latin ), as suggested by the depiction of Aurboða as a girl rather than a jötunn in Fjölsvinnsmál. According to philologist Rudolf Simek, however, the testimony of Fjölsvinnsmäl is probably secondary, and the root  is also found in the names of other jötnar and dwarfs such as Aurgelmir and Aurvangr.

In Fjölsvinnsmál (The Lay of Fjölsvinn), another figure named  is mentioned as one of the nine maidens sitting at the knees of their mistress the jötunn Menglöd.

Attestation 
In both Hyndluljód (The Lay of Hyndla) and Gylfaginning (Beguiling of Gylfi), Aurboða is portrayed as the mother of the jötunn Gerðr.

See also
Angrboða, another female jötun

Notes

References

Gýgjar